The Columbia Public School District is located in Columbia, Boone County, Missouri.  The district is Accredited with Distinction by the Missouri Department of Elementary and Secondary Education. 19,052 students are enrolled as of 2020. The district has four high schools, seven middle schools, and twenty-one elementary schools. The district also has a career center, preschool, gifted education school, and special education school.  The current Superintendent, Brian Yearwood, started with the district on July 1st, 2021.

Prior to 2013, there were three middle schools for grades 6-7 and three junior high schools for grades 8–9. With the opening of Battle High School, 9th grade was able to move to high school and all six schools became middle schools for grades 6–8.

The seventh middle school, John Warner Middle School, opened its doors in the 2020 school year.

Schools

Elementary (K–5)
Alpha Hart Lewis Elementary School
Benton STEM Elementary School (formerly Benton Elementary School)
Beulah Ralph Elementary School
Blue Ridge Elementary School
Cedar Ridge Elementary School
Center for Gifted Education - Enrichment and Extension (formerly Eugene Field Elementary School)
Derby Ridge Elementary School
Eliot Battle Elementary School
Fairview Elementary School
U.S. Grant Elementary School
Locust Street Expressive Arts Elementary School (formerly Robert E. Lee Elementary School)
Midway Heights Elementary School
Mill Creek Elementary School
New Haven Elementary School
Mary Paxton Keeley Elementary School
Parkade Elementary School
Ridgeway Elementary School
Rock Bridge Elementary School
Russell Boulevard Elementary School
Shepard Boulevard Elementary School
Two Mile Prairie Elementary School
West Boulevard Elementary School

Middle schools (6–8)
 Gentry Middle School
 Jefferson Middle School: A STEAM Academy (formerly, Jefferson Middle School, Jefferson Junior High School, and Columbia High School) 
 Lange Middle School 
 Oakland Middle School (formerly Oakland Junior High School)
 Smithton Middle School 
 West Middle School (formerly West Junior High School)
 John Warner Middle School

High schools (9–12)
David H. Hickman High School
Rock Bridge High School 
Douglass High School 
Muriel Williams Battle High School 
Columbia Area Career Center

References

External links
Columbia Public Schools

School districts in Missouri
Education in Columbia, Missouri
Government of Columbia, Missouri